Krychaw or Krichev is a city in Mogilev Region, Belarus. Krychaw is the administrative center of Krychaw District. As of 2009, its population was 27,202. 
It is located on the Sozh River.

Krychaw was first mentioned in 1136.

The Soviet Air Force Krichev Air Base was located east of Krychaw during the Cold War.

References

External links
 
 Kryčaŭ - travel guide - photos and attractions at Radzima.org
 History of Krychaw in old photographs at Krichev.gov.by

Cities in Belarus
Populated places in Mogilev Region
Krychaw District
Radimichs
Cherikovsky Uyezd